Lakshadweep, is a union territory of India.

The name Lakshadweep means "one lakh islands" (one hundred thousand islands) in Malayalam and Sanskrit, though the Laccadive Islands are just one part of the archipelago of no more than a hundred islands. Malayalam is the primary as well as the widely spoken native language in the territory. The region forms a single Indian district with 10 subdivisions. Kavaratti serves as the capital of the Union Territory and the region comes under the jurisdiction of Kerala High Court. The islands are the northernmost of the Lakshadweep–Maldives–Chagos group of islands, which are the tops of a vast undersea mountain range, the Chagos-Lakshadweep Ridge. The Lakshadweep originally consisted of 36 islands; however, due to the Parali 1 island being submerged in water due to sea erosion, 35 islands remain.

The islands were also mentioned in the Buddhist Jataka stories of the sixth century BCE. Islam was established in the region when Muslims arrived around the seventh century. During the medieval period, the region was ruled by the Chera dynasty, the Chola dynasty, and finally the Kingdom of Kannur. The Catholic Portuguese arrived around 1498 but were expelled by 1545. The region was then ruled by the Muslim house of Arakkal, who were vassals to the Kolathiri Rajas of Kannur, followed by Tipu Sultan. On his death in 1799, most of the region passed on to the British and with their departure, the Union Territory was formed in 1956.

Of the total 36 islands, 10 are inhabited. At the 2011 Indian census, the population of the Union Territory was 64,473. The majority of the indigenous population is Muslim and most of them belong to the Shafi school of the Sunni sect. The islanders are ethnically similar to the Malayali people of the nearest Indian state of Kerala. Most of the population speaks Malayalam with Dhivehi being the most spoken language in Minicoy island. Jeseri dialect is spoken in the inhabited islands of archipelago, namely Amindivi and Laccadive Islands, with an exception of the southernmost island of Minicoy, where the Mahl dialect is used. The Ponnani script of Malayalam was used to write Jeseri until the British Raj. The culture is almost similar to that of Mappilas in the nearest mainland state of Kerala. The islands are served by an airport on Agatti Island. The main occupation of the people is fishing and coconut cultivation, with tuna being the main item of export.

History

Ancient history
As the islands have no aboriginal inhabitants, scholars have suggested different histories for the settlement of these islands. Archaeological evidence supports the existence of human settlement in the region around 1500 BCE. The islands have long been known to sailors, as indicated by an anonymous reference from the first century CE to the region in Periplus of the Erythraean Sea. There are references to the control of the islands by the Cheras in the Sangam Patiṟṟuppattu. Local traditions and legends attribute the first settlement on these islands to the period of Cheraman Perumal, the last Chera king of Kerala. The oldest inhabited islands in the group are Amini, Kalpeni Andrott, Kavaratti, and Agatti.

Islamic influences
The local legends attribute the history of Islam here to the Legend of Cheraman Perumals, the last Chera king of Kerala, who left for pilgrimage from the island of Dharmadom near Kannur to Mecca. However, the legend is not substantiated. According to popular tradition, Islam was brought to Lakshadweep by Ubaidullah in 661 CE. His grave is located on the island of Andrott.

Medieval period
During the 11th century, the islands came under the rule of the Late Cholas when the Cholas conquered parts of Kerala and subsequently the islands came under the Kingdom of Kannur. The islands had an important role in the Indian Ocean trade during the medieval period as it was located in the principal trade route which connected the Middle East with Malabar Coast, Ceylon, and Southeast Asia (Indonesia and Malaysia).

Modern period
In the 16th century, the Portuguese ruled the seas between Ormus and the Malabar Coast and south to Ceylon. As early as 1498 when the Vasco da Gama arrived at Kozhikode during the Age of Discovery, they took control of the archipelago (called Laquedivas by them), later on to exploit coir production, until the islanders expelled them in 1545. In the mid 16th century all the inhabited islands of the Lakshadweep were conferred as jagir on the ruling family of the Cannanore Kingdom (Arakkal Kingdom) by the Chirakkal or Kolattiri Raja in order to grant protection from the Portuguese. The Arakkal kingdom had jurisdiction over Laccadive and Amindivi groups of islands, in addition to the city of Kannur. The islands are also mentioned in great detail in the stories of the Arab traveller Ibn Batuta. 

The Aminidivi group of islands (Amini, Kadmat, Kiltan, Chetlath, and Bitra) came under the rule of Tipu Sultan in 1787. They were passed to British control after the Third Anglo-Mysore War and were attached to Kasaragod Taluk of South Canara. The rest of the islands (Agatti, Andrott, Minicoy, Kavaratti, Kalpeni, and Bangaram) remained under the suzerainty of the Arakkal family of Kannur in return for a payment of annual tribute. The British took over the administration of those islands for nonpayment of arrears. These islands were attached to the Malabar district of the Madras Presidency during the British Raj. Later it was placed under Kozhikode Taluk.

Independent India
On 1 November 1956, during the reorganization of Indian states, the Lakshadweep islands were separated from Malabar District and organised into a separate union territory for administrative purposes. The new territory was called Laccadive, Minicoy, and Amindivi Islands before adopting the Lakshadweep name on 1 November 1973. The headquarters of the new union territory remained at Kozhikode for nearly a decade until 1964. In 1964, the seat of administrator of the islands was shifted to Kavaratti.

To safeguard India's vital shipping lanes to the Middle East, and the growing relevance of the islands in security considerations, an Indian Navy base, INS Dweeprakshak, was commissioned on Kavaratti island.

Geography

Lakshadweep is an archipelago of twelve atolls, three reefs and five submerged banks, with a total of about thirty-nine islands and islets. The reefs are in fact also atolls, although mostly submerged, with only small unvegetated sand cays above the high-water mark. The submerged banks are sunken atolls. Almost all the atolls have a northeast–southwest orientation with the islands lying on the eastern rim, and a mostly submerged reef on the western rim, enclosing a lagoon. It has ten inhabited islands, 17 uninhabited islands, attached islets, four newly formed islets and five submerged reefs.

Climate

The main islands are Kavaratti, Agatti, Minicoy, and Amini. The total population of the territory is 64,473 according to the 2011 census. Agatti has an airport with direct flights from Kochi.

India's Coral Islands
The Aminidivi subgroup of islands (consisting of Amini, Keltan, Chetlat, Kadamat, Bitra, and Perumal Par) and the Laccadive subgroup of islands (comprising mainly Androth, Kalpeni, Kavaratti, Pitti, and Suheli Par), both subgroups having a submarine connection between them through Pitti Bank. Together with Minicoy Island, a lonely atoll located at the southern end of the 200-km-broad Nine Degree Channel, they form the Coral Islands of India in the Arabian Sea. All these islands have been built up by corals and have fringing coral reefs very close to their shores.

Two banks further north are not considered part of the group:
 Angria Bank
 Adas Bank

The atolls, reefs, and banks are listed from north to south in the table:

Flora and fauna

The Lakshadweep Archipelago, together with the Maldives and the Chagos, forms the Maldives-Lakshadweep-Chagos Archipelago tropical moist forests ecoregion. It has over 600 species of marine fishes, 78 species of corals, 82 species of seaweed, 52 species of crabs, 2 species of lobsters, 48 species of gastropods, 12 species of bivalves, 101 species of birds. It is one of the four coral reef regions in India. The corals are a major attraction for the tourist. Pitti Island, is an important breeding place for sea turtles and for a number of pelagic birds such as the brown noddy (Anous stolidus), lesser crested tern (Sterna bengalensis) and greater crested tern (Sterna bergii). The island has been declared a bird sanctuary. Cetacean diversity off the Lakshadweep Islands and in adjacent areas is higher than other areas although a lack of scientific study results in poor understanding and conservation promoting. These include various whales (e.g. pygmy blue, Bryde's, sperm), smaller cetaceans (e.g. orca, pilot whale) and dolphins.

The region does not have a rich flora and almost all the plants can be found on the mainland of India. There is also an absence of forest in the region. Nearly 400 species of flowering plants have been documented, including three species of sea grasses Cymodocea isoetifolia, Syringodium isoetifolium and Thalassia hemprichii, other angiosperms as Pandanus, Heliotropium foertherianum, Tournefortia argentea and Pemphis acidula as well as fungi, algae, lichens are also found. The common flora of the coral sands include coconut groves and coastal shrubs as Pemphis acidula, Cordia subcordata, Scaevola taccada, Thespesia populnea, Suriana maritima, Dodonaea viscosa, Guettarda speciosa and seaweeds such as sea lettuces, Codium and Hypena.

Government and administration

Lakshadweep is one of India's eight union territories. The islands constitute a single Indian district, and are governed by an administrator appointed by the President of India under article 239 of the constitution. The current administrator is Praful Khoda Patel.  There are ten sub-divisions of the territory. In Minicoy and Agatti the Sub Division is under a Deputy Collector while in the remaining eight islands developmental activities are coordinated by Sub Divisional Officers. The Collector cum Development Commissioner who is also the District Magistrate oversees matters coming under district administration, such as revenue, land settlement, law and order. The District Magistrate is assisted by one Additional District Magistrate and Ten Executive Magistrates with respect to enforcement of law and order. Administrator in his capacity as Inspector General of Lakshadweep Police has command and control of the Lakshadweep Police. Administration Secretariat is in Kavaratti. For judiciary, the union territory corresponds to the Kerala High Court at Kochi along with a system of lower courts. The territory elects one member to the lower house of the Indian parliament, the Lok Sabha.

Demographics

According to the 2011 census Lakshadweep has a population of 64,473, roughly equal in number to that of the Marshall Islands. This gives it a ranking of 627th among the 640 districts in India. Lakshadweep has an urban population of 50,332 (78%) and rural population of 14,141 (22%). Its population growth rate over the decade 2001-2011 was 6.23%. Lakshadweep has a sex ratio of 946 females for every 1000 males, and a literacy rate of 92.28%. Fertility rate in Lakshadweep is 1.4, which is way below the national average.

Most people of Lakshadweep are descendants of migrants from the Malabar Coast of southwest India and the islanders are ethnically similar to coastal Kerala's Malayali people. More than 93% of the indigenous population are Muslims, and the majority of them belong to the Shafi School of the Sunni Sect. The southernmost and second largest island of Minicoy has an ethnically Mahls population that are native to the Maldives.

Religion

The inhabitants of Lakshadweep were known to practice different religious customs. Then Islam was propounded by the Sheikh Ubaidullah.

The spread of Islam has contributed to the religious identity of Lakshadweep thus leaving Muslims as the majority of the population. Eid-ul-Fitr, Muharram, Eid-ul-Adha and Milad-un-Nabi are the prominent occasions when the people of the island gather in various mosques. The culture is almost similar to that of Mappilas in the nearest mainland state of Kerala.

Religious observance in Lakshadweep is characterized by certain festivals that are found in its core ethnic groups. Moulood is one such religious event when the islanders offer prayers to the divine power and eat in groups. The festival of Ratheeb is another uncommon occasion which originated in the Kavaratti region of Lakshadweep. The grave of Sheikh Kasim, one of the respected saints is praised during Ratheeb by the people of the island to gather his holy blessings.

Sunni Islam (following the Shafi'i school) is the predominant faith.

Languages

The principal languages of Lakshadweep are Malayalam, Jeseri (Dweep Bhasha) and Mahl. The people of all the northern islands speak a dialect of Malayalam with the influence of Arabic similar to Arabi Malayalam. The people of Minicoy, the southernmost atoll, speak Mahl, a variant of Divehi language spoken in the Maldives. Jeseri (also known as Jesri or Dweep Bhasha) is a dialect of Malayalam, spoken in Lakshadweep. It is spoken on the islands of Chetlat, Bitra, Kiltan, Kadmat, Amini, Kavaratti, Androth, Agatti, and Kalpeni, in the archipelago of Lakshadweep. Each of these islands has its own dialect.

Malayalam with Malayalam script was introduced as the primary language of Lakshadweep during the British Raj, while previously a type of Arabic script, which is also known as Ponnani script or Arabi Malayalam script, was used for writing the language. The policy was continued by the Indian government. Malayalam serves as a link language on the islands including on the Mahl dominated Minicoy Island. The dances here include: Lava Dance, Kolkali Dance and Parichakli Dance.

Economy
There is little economic inequality in Lakshadweep and the poverty index is low. Coconut fibre extraction and production of fibre products is Lakshadweep's main industry. There are five coir fibre factories, five production demonstration centres and seven fibre curling units run by the government of India. These units produce coir fibre, coir yarn, curled fibre and corridor mattings.

Fisheries
Lakshadweep comprises the only coral atolls of the country. Fishing is the main livelihood of the islanders, or else it is coconut fibre. Freshly caught tuna is processed by drying it in the sun after cooking and smoking. The resultant product, known as 'mas', are popular products exported from these islands to southeast Asian countries. Eleven workshops in the islands and two boat building yards cater to the needs of fishermen. There are 375 boats in operation in Lakshadweep.

Tourism

Due to its isolation and scenic appeal, Lakshadweep was already known as a tourist attraction for Indians since 1974. This brings in significant revenue, which is likely to increase. Since such a small region cannot support industries, the government is actively promoting tourism as a means of income in Bangaram and Kadmat islands. Bangaram is projected to become a major destination for international tourism. Marine fauna are plentiful. Water sports activities such as scuba diving, wind surfing, snorkelling, surfing, kayaking, canoeing, water skiing, sportfishing, yachting and night sea voyages are popular activities among tourists. Tourists flock to these islands throughout the year, except during the southwest monsoon months when seas are extremely rough. These will be the smallest customs offices in India. Tourism is expected to get a big boost after these offices open as the islands lie on one of the busiest cruise passages.

Tourists essentially need a permission to visit the islands; foreign nationals are not permitted to visit certain islands. According to the current alcohol laws of India, alcoholic beverage consumption is not permitted in the Lakshadweep Archipelago except on Bangaram Island.

To boost the economy, high-end tourism, tele-medicine, tele-education, fisheries, and others, the union government announced a project to install under-sea fibre optic cable for high-speed mobile and internet connectivity between Kochi and 11 islands of Lakshadweep including Kavaratti, Kalpeni, Agati, Amini, Androth, Minicoy, Bangaram, Bitra, Chetlat, Kiltan and Kadmat. This  project will be completed by May 2023.

Lakshadweep will receive its first statue of Mahatma Gandhi in connection with the celebrations of Mahatma Gandhi's 152nd birthday.

Desalination
A low-temperature thermal desalination plant opened on Kavaratti in 2005, at a cost of 50 million (€922,000). The experimental plant, which uses the temperature difference between warm surface seawater and much colder seawater at  depth to generate potable water as well as energy, was put in place to produce 100,000 litres/day of potable water from seawater. Production costs in 2005 were 220-250/m3 (€4.1-4.6/m3); the cost was supposed to drop to 30-60/m3 (€0.55-1.11/m3) with increased capacity.

The technology was developed by the National Institute of Ocean Technology. It can be used to produce drinking water and also for power generation and air conditioning. In addition, the deep seawater contains extra nutrients for fish, an important source of food and income for the local population. The government plans to set up desalination plants with a capacity of 10 million litres/per day on all islands and coastal areas. In 2009, the NIOT announced plans to build plants on Minicoy, Agatti and Andrott.

Education

General
 Calicut University Centre, Kadmath
 Government Jawaharlal Nehru College, Lakshadweep
 Mahatma Gandhi College, Lakshadweep
 P. M. Sayeed Calicut University Centre, Andrott
 College of Education, Calicut University Centre, Kavaratti

School
 Jawahar Navodaya Vidyalaya, Minicoy

Transportation

Air 
Agatti Airport on Agatti Island is the only airport in Lakshadweep. Alliance Air, a subsidiary of the state-owned carrier Air India, serves Agatti and flies to Kochi and Bengaluru. Other islands are linked by the Pawan Hans helicopter

Sea/Cruise 
Six ships connect Kochi, Kozhikode (Beypore) and Lakshadweep: , MV Amindivi, MV Minicoy, MV Arabian Sea, MV Lakshadweep Sea and MV Bharath Seema. Boat/ferry service is available between islands.

See also

 Coral reefs in India
 Agatti Island
 Lakshadweep (Lok Sabha constituency)
 Lakshadweep Police
 Andaman Islands

References

Further reading
 R. C. Majumdar (1979) The History of Ancient Lakshadweep, Calcutta.
 S. Anandan, Lakshadweep – Between the sea and a hard place, The Hindu, 30 May 2021.

External links

 
 "Paradise lost? India's Lakshadweep islanders reject plan to create 'new Maldives'. Islanders accuse new administrator of trying to erase their traditions, identity and livelihood", "The National", June 15, 2021

 
.
Union territories of India

Atolls of India
Archipelagoes of the Indian Ocean
5th-century establishments
Populated places established in the 5th century
States and territories established in 1956
1956 establishments in India
States and union territories of India
Districts of Lakshadweep
Tourism
Tourism articles by importance